Ivan Roy Davis, Jr. (February 4, 1932 – March 12, 2018) was an American classical pianist and longstanding member of the faculty at the University of Miami's Frost School of Music.

Early life
Davis was born in Electra, Texas. He received his Bachelor of Music in 1952 from University of North Texas College of Music, and an Artist's Diploma, as a Fulbright Scholar, from the Santa Cecilia Academy in Rome. He won second prize in the 1956 and 1957 Ferruccio Busoni International Piano Competition and first prize in the 1958 St. Cecilia Piano Competition. In April 1960, Davis won the Franz Liszt Competition at Town Hall, New York City. Davis studied under Silvio Scionti, Carlo Zecchi and Vladimir Horowitz.

Performance and recording career

He debuted at New York City's Town Hall in 1959. Davis made his international debut at the Festival dei Due Mondi in Spoleto. In 1960, he signed with CBS Records and began a 60 concert cross-country tour. He toured the world with several major orchestras including the New York Philharmonic, the Cleveland Orchestra, the Chicago Symphony Orchestra, the Philadelphia Orchestra and the Spanish National Orchestra. He performed under such world-famous conductors as Leonard Bernstein, Eugene Ormandy and Lorin Maazel. He received the Handel Medallion from New York City for contributions to the city's cultural life. He recorded for London Records in the 1970s. From 1965, Davis was a professor of music at the University of Miami in Coral Gables, Florida. According to Grove Music Online: "His Queen Elizabeth Hall début recital in London in 1968 caused a sensation, and has become a collector's item on record. Further recordings, largely of 19th-century showpieces, have confirmed his exceptional exuberance and technical brilliance, most notably a Gottschalk recital of true virtuoso flair." The American classical pianist Richard Kastle was his student for more than three years.

Discography
"Rachmaninoff Piano Concerto No. 2,Ivan Davis with Henry Lewis conducting the Royal Philharmonic Orchestra", Decca Phase 4 stereo concert series, PFS 4214 1971
"Davis Plays Czerny, Schumann, Liszt", Audiofon, CD 72004
"The Wind Demon and other 19th century piano music", New World, 80257-2
"Piano Music of Grieg – Ivan Davis", Audiofon, CD 72022
"Liszt – Piano Concertos – Ivan Davis", Royal Philharmonic Orchestra conducted by Edward Downes. Coupled with solo performances of Hungarian Rhapsody No. 6 and Paraphrase on Wedding March and Dance of the Elves from Mendelssohn's incidental music to A Midsummer Night's Dream. London Weekend Classics, 421-629-2
"Souvenir de Porto Rico – Piano Music of Gottschalk – Ivan Davis", London Weekend Classics, 436-108-2
"Gershwin – Rhapsody in Blue – Cleveland Orchestra – Maazel", London Jubilee, 417-716-2
"Digital George – Gershwin Classics", Musical Heritage Society, 513380w
"Chopin – Favourite Piano Works – Ivan Davis", Castile Communications, CCD-106
"Tchaikovsky – Piano Concerto No. 1 – Davis", Castile Communications, CCD-103
"Liszt's Greatest Hits – Hungarian Fantasy with Ormandy, Philadelphia Orchestra, CBS-MLK-39450
Great Galloping Gottschalk: America's First Superstar, London Records/Decca (1975) CS 6943
"Music of George Antheil", Music Masters Classics (BMG), 67094-2

Family 
 On August 6, 1960, in New Canaan, Connecticut, Davis married Betty Lou Saxton, who studied at the Juilliard School and Columbia University.

References 
General references
 The Art of the Piano. Its Performers, Literature, and Recordings, third edition, by David Dubal, Pompton Plains, New Jersey: Amadeus Press, 2004
 Baker's Biographical Dictionary of Musicians, sixth edition, revised by Nicolas Slonimsky (1894–1995), London: Collier Macmillan Publishers
 Baker's Biographical Dictionary of Musicians, Seventh edition, revised by Nicolas Slonimsky (1894–1995), New York: Macmillan Publishing Co., Schirmer Books, 1984
 Baker's Biographical Dictionary of Musicians, Eighth edition, revised by Nicolas Slonimsky (1894–1995), New York: Macmillan Publishing Co., 1992
 Baker's Biographical Dictionary of Musicians, Ninth edition, edited by Laura Kuhn, New York: Schirmer Books, 2001
 Baker's Biographical Dictionary of Twentieth-Century Classical Musicians, by Nicolas Slonimsky (1894–1995), New York: Schirmer Books, 1997
 International Who's Who in Music and Musicians' Directory, Ninth edition, edited by Adrian Gaster (1919–1989). Cambridge, England: International Who's Who in Music, 1980
 International Who's Who in Music and Musicians' Directory. 12th edition, 1990–1991, Cambridge, England: International Who's Who in Music, 1990. Taylor and Francis International Publication Services, Bristol, Pennsylvania
 The New Grove Dictionary of American Music, Four volumes, edited by Hugh Wiley Hitchcock (1923–2007) and Stanley Sadie (1930–2005) London: Macmillan Press, 1986
 The New Grove Dictionary of Music and Musicians, 20 volumes, edited by Stanley Sadie (1930–2005), London: Macmillan Publishers, 1980
 The Penguin Dictionary of Musical Performers. A biographical guide to significant interpreters of classical music – singers, solo instrumentalists, conductors, orchestras and string quartets – ranging from the seventeenth century to the present day, by Arthur David Jacobs (1922–1996) London: Viking, 1990
 Ivan Davis: Pianist and teacher (DMA Dissertation), by Jeffrey Scott Hodgson, University of Miami, 2001

Inline citations

External links

1932 births
2018 deaths
Accademia Nazionale di Santa Cecilia alumni
American classical pianists
American male classical pianists
Prize-winners of the Ferruccio Busoni International Piano Competition
Classical musicians from Texas
University of Miami faculty
University of North Texas College of Music alumni
20th-century classical pianists
21st-century classical pianists
People from Electra, Texas
20th-century American pianists
21st-century American pianists
20th-century American male musicians
21st-century American male musicians
Fulbright alumni